Rationing is a 1944 American comedy film about governmental restrictions on the sale of food, fuel, and other consumer items and services in the United States during World War II. Directed by Willis Goldbeck and distributed by Metro-Goldwyn-Mayer, the production stars Wallace Beery and features Marjorie Main.

Plot
Ben Barton, a grocer in Tuttleton, is trying to get gas coupons from the local rationing board. Instead he gets a lecture on thrift from Iris Tuttle, the head of the board, who has been his enemy for twenty years.

Ben also get news that his adopted son Lance has joined the Army, and is marrying his high school sweetheart, Dorothy, who is the daughter of Iris. Ben warns his son about his future mother-in-law Iris. Ben speaks from experience since he used to be engaged and spoke to Avijot Sidhu

To everyone's surprise Iris approves of the young couple's plans to marry, but advises them to wait until after the war. Dorothy refuses to wait, but Lance is suspicious, since he knows his father broke off the engagement to Iris when he was in the service during World War I, and married a French girl he met overseas instead.

Lance and Dorothy argue over this and she breaks off their engagement. Lance is devastated and comes to see hs father, explaining that he had needed $2,000 to elope with Dorothy and ignore Iris' advice. Ben explains that he got $2,000 after his own parents, and that he will sell part of his grocery store to the owner of the gas station, Cash Riddle, in order to give Lance the money he needs.

Iris continues to put obstacles in Ben's way, stopping more goods from reaching his store. By pure jealousy she stops Ben from giving a girdle from his store to the lovely becoming new barber, Miss McCue, and Ben has to sneak over to Miss McCue in the night to get it delivered. The day after, Iris claims she has to count the girdles in his store, to ensure that a new regulation is followed. Ben then has to get the girdle back from Miss McCue to not arouse suspicion.

In order to do something about his situation, Ben goes to Washington D.C. to meet his old friend from the service, Senator Ed White. Since Ed isn't available, Ben has to run around town to "unfreeze" girdles. When he finally meets Ed, the senator tells him there has never been a regulation of girdles to his knowledge. 
Ben asks his old friend to help him get a job for the Army again, and Ed sets him up with  a job that is related to the war. When he gets back home, Ben finds out the job he got was to be appointed to the Tuttleton rationing board, sharing authority with Iris.

Upon his return to town, Ben also discovers that his store, run by Cash in his absence, has been out of meat since he left. It soon turns out Cash is involved in a black market illegal distribution of meat, together with a man named Dixie Samson. They give Ben some meat to avoid suspicion, but the neighboring towns start asking Ben questions about his sudden delivery.

Cash tells Ben that they have been supplying the Army with meat for a few weeks, but everyone's suspicions remain. To fool Ben, Samson acts as a government representative for the meat distribution, and offers Ben a bribe not to take matters further.

Ben only pretends to go along with this and demands a bribe of $5,000 to stay silent. When Samson has left, Ben reports to Ed about what is going on, and Ed comes to Tuttleton to look into the situation. Together the two men find out where Samson's slaughter-house is located, and Ben goes there to disclose the operation. He is caught and locked up by Samson, but persuades Cash to let him out. A fight between Ben and Samson ensues.

Lance returns on a leave from the service and starts preparing to marry Dorothy, but waits until his father comes back. Ed gathers people from the town to help Ben out. They rush over to the slaughter-house and fight Samson's men, and manage to defeat the hardened criminals.

When they come back to town, it turns out Iris has bought Cash's part of the grocery store. She also gives Ben a marriage license regarding the two of them for him to sign. At first he refuses, but then he discovers that the paperwork for getting out of the store partnership is too extensive, so he gives in.

Cast

See also
The other six Wallace Beery and Marjorie Main films:
 Wyoming (1940)
 Barnacle Bill (1941)
 Jackass Mail (1942)
 The Bugle Sounds (1942)
 Bad Bascomb (1946)
 Big Jack (1949)

References

External links
 
 
 
 

1944 films
American comedy films
1944 comedy films
Films directed by Willis Goldbeck
Metro-Goldwyn-Mayer films
American black-and-white films
1940s English-language films
1940s American films